William Stephen Temple-Gore-Langton, 4th Earl Temple of Stowe (11 May 1847 – 28 March 1902), known as William Gore-Langton until 1892, was a British Conservative politician.

Biography
Gore-Langton was the son of William Gore-Langton and Lady Anna Eliza Mary, daughter of Richard Temple-Grenville, 2nd Duke of Buckingham and Chandos. On his father's side he was a descendant of Sir John Gore, Lord Mayor of London in 1624, and a kinsman of the Gore Baronets, the Earls of Arran and the Barons Harlech. He was elected to the House of Commons as one of two representatives for Somerset Mid in 1878, a seat he held until 1885. In 1892 he succeeded his uncle Richard Temple-Grenville, 3rd Duke of Buckingham and Chandos, as fourth Earl Temple of Stowe, according to a special remainder in the letters patent. He assumed by Royal licence the same year the additional surname and arms of Temple.

He was a major in the North Somerset Yeomanry, a Deputy Lieutenant and Justice of the peace for the county of Somerset, and an alderman.

Family
Lord Temple of Stowe married, in 1870, Helen Mabel Graham-Montgomery, daughter of Sir Graham Graham-Montgomery, 3rd Baronet (her younger sister later married his uncle, and became the last Duchess of Buckingham and Chandos). They had three sons and five daughters:
 Algernon William Stephen Temple-Gore-Langton, 5th Earl Temple of Stowe (1871–1940)
 Captain Honourable Chandos Temple-Gore-Langton (1873–1921), Captain 1st Dragoon Guards
 Lady Gertrude Alice Temple-Gore-Langton (1874–1919); married 1904 Major William Maurice Copland du Quesne Caillard
 Lady Mabel Evelyn Temple-Gore-Langton (1876–1966)
 Lady Alice Mary Temple-Gore-Langton (1876–1961)
 Lady Frances Aline Temple-Gore-Langton (1877–1952)
 Lady Clare Violet Temple-Gore-Langton (1880–1966); married 1903 Thomas Francis Egerton
 Lieutenant-Commander Honourable Evelyn Arthur Temple-Gore-Langton (1884–1972), Royal Navy

In late 1901 the Earl and Countess left for Cairo to spend the winter in Egypt due to his ill health. He died there on 28 March 1902, aged 54, and was succeeded in the earldom by his eldest son Algernon, Lord Langton. His body was embalmed and brought back to the United Kingdom, where he was buried at Newton St Loe on 19 April 1902.

Lady Temple of Stowe died in 1919.

Notes

References
Kidd, Charles, Williamson, David (editors). Debrett's Peerage and Baronetage (1990 edition). New York: St Martin's Press, 1990.

External links 

1847 births
1902 deaths
Earls Temple of Stowe
Gore-Langton, William
Gore-Langton, William
Gore-Langton, William
UK MPs who inherited peerages
William
William
North Somerset Yeomanry officers
Place of birth missing